Oliver Shanks (November 15, 1915 – 1970) was a Canadian boxer who competed in the 1936 Summer Olympics.

He was born in Edmonton, Alberta, but later took up residence in Montreal, Quebec.

In 1936 he was eliminated in the second round of the light heavyweight class after losing his fight to Hannes Koivunen. He turned pro shortly after his return home to Canada.

1936 Olympic results
Below is the record of Oliver Shanks, a Canadian light heavyweight boxer who competed at the 1936 Berlin Olympics:

 Round of 32: bye
 Round of 16: lost to Hannes Koivunen (Finland) by decision

Related to Kennith Lee [Shanks]

External links

profile

1915 births
1970 deaths
Sportspeople from Edmonton
Light-heavyweight boxers
Olympic boxers of Canada
Boxers at the 1936 Summer Olympics
Canadian male boxers